Ochoco Summit (el. 4720 ft.) is a mountain pass in Oregon traversed by Oregon Route 26. In 2011, The Forest Service for the U.S. Department of Agriculture announced its project to add more trails to Ochoco Summit.

References 

Mountain passes of Oregon
Mountains of Crook County, Oregon
Mountains of Wheeler County, Oregon